Khoái Châu is a township and capital of Khoái Châu District, Hưng Yên Province, Vietnam.

References

Populated places in Hưng Yên province
District capitals in Vietnam
Townships in Vietnam